Echoes of Decimation is the third studio album by American technical death metal band Origin. It was released through Relapse Records, on March 15, 2005. 

A focus-point on extremely fast arpeggios was made on this album. The band later called these "RIFFARPS" as they  were arpeggios as a form of a riff instead of being used as a solo.

Track listing

Credits
James Lee - vocals
Paul Ryan - guitars / writing credits track 1-2-3-6
Clinton Appelhanz - guitars / writing credits track 4-7-8-9, engineer
Mike Flores - bass writing credits track 5
James King - drums
Robert Rebeck- engineer
Alan Douches - mastering
Robert Black - artwork

Was released as CD & limited edition Picture Disc

References

Origin (band) albums
2005 albums
Relapse Records albums